This is the results breakdown of the local elections held in Castile and León on 10 June 1987. The following tables show detailed results in the autonomous community's most populous municipalities, sorted alphabetically.

Overall

City control
The following table lists party control in the most populous municipalities, including provincial capitals (shown in bold). Gains for a party are displayed with the cell's background shaded in that party's colour.

Municipalities

Ávila
Population: 43,603

Burgos
Population: 158,331

León
Population: 134,641

Palencia
Population: 75,403

Ponferrada
Population: 59,258

Salamanca
Population: 152,833

Segovia
Population: 53,397

Soria
Population: 31,144

Valladolid
Population: 327,452

Zamora
Population: 60,364

See also
1987 Castilian-Leonese regional election

References

Castile and León
1987